State Road 211 is a short east–west connector route in southeast Harrison County in the U.S. State of Indiana.

Route description
State Road 211 begins at an intersection with State Road 11 northeast of the town of Elizabeth. The terminus is a short distance away from the Ohio River.

There is no section of SR 211 that is included as a part of the National Highway System, a system of routes determined to be the most important for the nation's economy, mobility and defense. The highway is maintained by the Indiana Department of Transportation (INDOT) like all other state roads in the state. The department tracks the traffic volumes along all state highways as a part of its maintenance responsibilities using a metric called average annual daily traffic (AADT). This measurement is a calculation of the traffic level along a segment of roadway for any average day of the year. In 2010, INDOT figured that the traffic levels present on SR 211 were 2,490 vehicles and 60 commercial vehicles daily.

Major intersections

References

External links

211
Transportation in Harrison County, Indiana